Leonard Emil Rohde (April 16, 1938 – May 13, 2017) was an American football offensive tackle who played fifteen seasons for the San Francisco 49ers of the National Football League. He helped the 49ers win the NFC West Division from 1970–72 and he was selected to the Pro Bowl after the 1970 season. Rohde played college football at Utah State University

The 49ers offense he played with led the NFL in points scored in 1965 and 1970 and the NFC in 1972. The 49ers offense also led the NFL in yards gained in 1965 and the NFC in 1970. The 49ers also led the NFL in passing yards in 1965 and 1969 and the NFC in 1970 and 1972. Rohde died on May 13, 2017, aged 79. Apart from American football, Rohde worked in fast food as the owner of several Burger King and Applebee's restaurants.

References 

1938 births
2017 deaths
People from Palatine, Illinois
Players of American football from Illinois
American football offensive tackles
San Francisco 49ers players
National Conference Pro Bowl players
Utah State Aggies football players
Burger King people